David Reinbacher (born 25 October 2004) is an Austrian professional ice hockey defenceman for EHC Kloten of Switzerland's National League (NL) and the top Austrian prospect in the 2023 NHL Entry Draft.

Playing career
Reinbacher played as a youth in Switzerland with Rheintal and Bülach before moving to Kloten at the under-15 level. Appearing within EHC Kloten junior ranks, Reinbacher made his professional debut in the Swiss League during the 2021–22 season.

In the following 2022–23 season, Reinbacher in his first full campaign, established himself as a regular on the Flyers blueline in the club's return to the National League at only 18 years of age.

International play
Reinbacher represented Team Austria at the 2023 World Junior Ice Hockey Championships, averaging over 26 minutes a game.

Career statistics

Regular season and playoffs

International

References

External links
 

2004 births
Living people
EHC Kloten players
Austrian ice hockey defencemen
People from Hohenems